The Amangu are an indigenous Yamatji people of the mid-western region of Western Australia.

Language
Two early glossaries of some words from the Champion Bay Amangu were collected. One, by R. J. Foley, was published in a work by Augustus Oldfield in 1865, and the other was gathered by the Colonial Secretary of Western Australia Roger Goldsworthy, and published by E. M. Curr two decades later.

Country
The northern boundary lay near Geraldton and the Hill River. The inland extension was from the coast as far as the vicinity of Mullewa, Morawa and Carnamah. The southern frontier is not clear, but is believed to have run down to the vicinity just north of Moora.

History
Excavation as Yellabidde Cave near Leeman indicate that the Amangu territory was occupied as early as 23,000 BP, putting back the accepted date for habitation of the Perth-Geraldton coast by some 15,000 years.

Some words
 agootha (mother)
 ammatha (father)
 kilire, kullali (emu)
 mini (whiteman)
 yellabidde (emu)

Notes

Citations

Sources

Noongar